War Party is the ninth studio album by the heavy metal band Gwar. It was released on October 26, 2004, being the band's first album in DRT Entertainment. The album was released to positive reviews.

Overview
After Violence Has Arrived, Gwar switched labels from Metal Blade to DRT Entertainment. War Party was released on October 26, 2004, and continues the decidedly heavier focus reintroduced in Violence Has Arrived. War Party is the most political Gwar album since America Must Be Destroyed, tackling such subject matter as the 2004 American election and the war in Iraq in such songs as "Bring Back the Bomb", "Krosstika", "War Party", "The Reaganator" and "You Can't Kill Terror". Dave Brockie said "...basically Gwar pledges support to the powers who support the war, and we make such a right-wing statement that the right wing would be ashamed to have us." 

Gwar still has more gratuitous violent imagery in "Womb With a View", "Fistful of Teeth" and "Bonesnapper" and retains some trademark silliness in the Beefcake hollered French punk song "The Bonus Plan". War Party was supported in fall 2004 by the Mock the Vote tour. The Enhanced CD portion contains a music video for "Womb With A View", which shows a plethora of concert footage from their spring 2004 tour.

Brockie was especially favourable about this album, as it continues with a heavier musical direction for the band. According to interviews with Todd Evans (Beefcake the Mighty) and Brockie, War Party was selling very well, and was attracting new Gwar fans, as well as seeing old ones come back.

Concept
Although not following a true story per se, unlike many of the band's previous albums, there seems to be an ongoing concept throughout the album about a fictional political party named "The War Party", with policies dedicated specifically to the eradication of the human race by supporting global war and hatred, under the "Krosstika", a symbol crossing the christian cross and the Nazi swastika ("Two great hates that hate great together"). The band refers to the Krosstika on their next studio album, Beyond Hell, and will often play this song towards the beginning of their concerts.

Though the War Party itself has disbanded (according to Gwar lore), the band continues to play songs from this album in concert, as the album is among the band's favorites, most notably Bring Back the Bomb.

Track listing

Personnel
Dave Brockie (Oderus Urungus) - lead vocals
Cory Smoot (Flattus Maximus) - lead guitar, backing vocals
Mike Derks (Balsac the Jaws of Death) - rhythm guitar, backing vocals
Todd Evans (Beefcake the Mighty) - bass guitar, backing vocals, lead vocals on "The Bonus Plan"
Brad Roberts (Jizmak Da Gusha) - drums, percussion

References

Concept albums
2004 albums
Gwar albums